NZGSS Hinemoa was a 542-ton New Zealand Government Service Steamer designed specifically for lighthouse support and servicing, and also for patrolling New Zealand's coastline and carrying out castaway checks and searching for missing ships. It operated in New Zealand's territorial waters from 1876 to 1944.

History 
Captain John Fairchild used the steamer to survey the Bounty Islands and Antipodes Islands in 1886, and the Herekino Harbour and the Whangape Harbour entrance in 1889. In 1891, while under the command of Captain Fairchild, the Hinemoa searched New Zealand's subantarctic and outlying islands for traces of the missing ships Kakanui and Assaye. While no trace was found of the former, the Assaye was suspected foundered off The Snares.

The Hinemoa provided assistance to the Sub-Antarctic Islands scientific expedition of 1907, a substantial scientific expedition sponsored by the Philosophical Institute of Canterbury, where important observations on the natural history of the islands were made. They were published as a two-volume work in 1909, edited by professor Charles Chilton.

Captain John Bollons was a notable master of the steamer from 1898; Bollons Island in the Antipodes Islands is named after him. Another to serve aboard the Hinemoa was William Edward Sanders, who won a Victoria Cross during World War I.

It had a sister ship, the GSS Stella, which carried out similar duties over the same time period. After its decommissioning in 1944, it was rejected for scrapping due to an oversupply at the time.

Footnotes

Sources 

 Marshall, B. (2005). "From Sextants to Satellites: A Cartographic Timeline for New Zealand". New Zealand Map Society Journal. 18. .
 Peat, N. (2003). Subantarctic New Zealand: A Rare Heritage. Invercargill: Department of Conservation. .
 Watt, J. P. C. (1989). Stewart Island's Kaipipi Shipyard and the Ross Sea Whalers. Havelock North: JPC Watt.

External links 
 Hinemoa – New Zealand Maritime Record
 Cruises of the New Zealand Government Steamer Hinemoa, 1906 - Scan of diary kept by Sanders whilst on the vessel.

1875 ships
Steamships of New Zealand
Merchant ships of New Zealand
World War I merchant ships of New Zealand
World War II merchant ships of New Zealand
Ships built on the River Clyde